The 2021 SportsCar Challenge at Mid-Ohio, known for sponsorship reasons as the 2021 Acura SportsCar Challenge, was a sports car race held at Mid-Ohio Sports Car Course near Lexington, Ohio on May 16th, 2021. The race is the third round of the 2021 IMSA SportsCar Championship, and the first round of the 2021 WeatherTech GT Daytona Sprint Cup.

Background

This race was initially meant to be the fifth round of the 2021 IMSA Championship, until the two "West Coast Swing" rounds, located at WeatherTech Raceway Laguna Seca and Long Beach street circuit, both in California, were postponed to September due to the ongoing COVID-19 pandemic in California.

On May 5th, 2021, the entry list for the event was released, featuring a total of 26 cars across three classes. Six cars were in Daytona Prototype International (DPi), another six entries were in the Le Mans Prototype 3 (LMP3) class, and 14 entries were received for the GT Daytona (GTD) class. The GT Le Mans (GTLM) and Le Mans Prototype 2 (LMP2) classes were not present. In the GTD class, several teams who were scheduled to be present only at the 3-hour rounds on the 2021 calendar made their season debut, including CarBahn Motorsports and Compass Racing, the former of which was making the step up from the IMSA SportsCar Championship support category, the Michelin Pilot Challenge.

This race also marked the start of the season for full-time Wright Motorsports driver, Ryan Hardwick, after suffering crashes that put him out of both the 24 Hours of Daytona and the 12 Hours of Sebring due to concussion. In those two races without Hardwick, Wright Motorsports built up a points lead in the GTD class.

In the LMP3 class, despite the absence of Forty7 motorsports, IndyCar team Andretti Autosport made their season debut with a Ligier JS P320 piloted by Jarett Andretti and Oliver Askew.

On May 5th, 2021, IMSA released a technical bulletin regarding the Balance of Performance constraints for the Mid-Ohio race. The Mazda RT24-P was given a slight power boost, with the equivalent of a 7.5 horsepower increase in engine output through turbo boost levels. After winning at Daytona and Sebring, the Acura ARX-05 and Cadillac DPi-V.R respectively were each given a 1.0 liter reduction in fuel capacity.

In the GTD class, after finishing in the top two places at the 12 Hours of Sebring, the Porsche 911 GT3 R was made 20 kilograms heavier, bringing the standard weight to 1,320 kilograms. A similar change was made to the Acura NSX GT3 Evo, with a 10 kilogram weight reduction after best finishes of 11th and 4th at Daytona and Sebring respectively.

References

External links

Sports Car Challenge at Mid-Ohio
Sports Car Challenge at Mid-Ohio
2021 WeatherTech SportsCar Championship season